Thandiswa is a South African feminine given name. Notable people with the name include:

 Thandiswa Marawu, South African politician
 Thandiswa Mazwai (born 1976), South African musician

African feminine given names